The 2014 Campeonato Cearense de Futebol was the 100th season of top professional football league in the state of Ceará, Brazil. The competition began on January 5 and ended on April 23. Ceará won the championship for the 43rd time and 4th since 2011, while Ferroviário, Tiradentes and Crato were relegated.

Format
The championship has three stages. On the first stage, all teams excluding those who are playing in 2014 Copa do Nordeste play a double round robin. The best four teams qualifies to the second stage.

On the second stage, the teams are joined by the clubs from Ceará who were playing on Copa Nordeste. The teams then play a double round robin again, where the best four teams qualifies to the final stage. In the final stage, it's a playoff with four teams.

The champion and the best team on first stage qualifies to the 2015 Copa do Brasil. The champion and the runner-up qualify to the 2015 Copa do Nordeste. The best team who isn't on Campeonato Brasileiro Série A, Série B or Série C qualifies to Série D. 

The two worst three in first stage will be relegated.

Participating teams

First stage

Results

Second stage
The four teams from the first stage are joined by Ceará and Guarany de Sobral who were playing on 2014 Copa do Nordeste.

Results

Final stage

Semifinals

First leg

Second leg

Finals

With the results from the Second stage and the final stage aggregated, Ceará won the title because they had a better campaign.

References

Cearense
2014